Nuulopa is a small, uninhabited island in the Apolima Strait between the islands of Upolu and Savaii in Samoa. The island is part of the Aiga-i-le-Tai district.

Nuulopa is about 50m above sea level. It is a small, forested, rocky outcrop with coconut palms (Cocos nucifera) and a conservation area for flying foxes. The surrounding sea is a conservation area for turtles.

Nu'ulopa sits between two other islands, Apolima and Manono. Those three islands lie on an underwater ridge that runs between the two main Samoan islands of Upolu and Savai'i.

Nu'ulopa has traditionally been used as a cemetery for the high chiefs (matai) of Manono.

Gallery

See also

 Samoa Islands
 Geography of Samoa
 List of islands
 Desert island

References

Uninhabited islands of Samoa
Aiga-i-le-Tai